Eddie Smith Field House is the home of the North Carolina Tar Heels during the indoor track and field season, as well as an indoor training facility for Carolina football. The field house contains Dick Taylor Track, a six-lane, 200-meter Mondo track, and John Pope Practice Field. It opened in late 2001 and has hosted several ACC Indoor Championships since.

References 

North Carolina Tar Heels sports venues
2001 establishments in North Carolina
Sports venues completed in 2001
College indoor track and field venues in the United States
Athletics (track and field) venues in North Carolina
Indoor track and field venues in the United States